The Nevada State Railroad Museum Boulder City is a railroad museum in Boulder City, Nevada which is an agency of the Nevada Department of Tourism and Cultural Affairs. The railway is located on the tracks that were installed to support construction activities at the Hoover Dam. The state obtained the tracks and right of way from the Union Pacific Railroad in 1985.

Heritage railroad 

The museum operates a heritage railroad which offers passenger excursion trains using historic railroad equipment on a 7-mile, 45 minute round trip. Operations began in 2002, and the museum also offers the opportunity for passengers to ride in the locomotive cab, the caboose and to operate trains (subject to reservations and availability).

This ride features a preserved former Union Pacific EMD GP30, No 844: Mount Hood 90, which became famous for necessitating the renumbering of steam locomotive 844 to 8444 from 1962 to 1989: Mount Hood Railroad 90! . It weighs approximately 125 tons and has a turbocharged V16 engine that develops 2250 hp. It was donated to the museum and refurbished in Union Pacific colors.

As part of the Interstate 11 project NDOT has replaced the bridge over US Route 93 that was taken out of service in 1998 during the widening of Highway 93 into Interstate 515. In April 2018, a grade separation was put in place at the former grade crossing near Railroad Pass Casino, effectively linking Boulder City and Henderson together.

Exhibits

7½ inch miniature railway 

The museum hosts a dedicated group of approximately 15 volunteers who on the second and fourth Saturdays, July and August excepted, provide free rides on the  gauge railroad. The miniatures are 1/8th full size and accommodate children and adults easily. The layout is in a constant state of progressive evolution.

See also 
Nevada State Railroad Museum – a railroad museum located in Carson City, Nevada

References

External links 

 Nevada State Railroad Museum website, Boulder City
 Friends of the Nevada Southern Railway
 www.rgusrail.com

Railroad museums in Nevada
Heritage railroads in Nevada
Buildings and structures in Boulder City, Nevada
Museums in the Las Vegas Valley